

A–R 

To find entries for A–R, use the table of contents above.

S 

 Sabine – Joseph Sabine (1770–1837)
 Sabourin – Lucien Sabourin (1904–1987)
 Sacc. – Pier Andrea Saccardo (1845–1920)
 Sachet – Marie-Hélène Sachet (1922–1986)
 Sachs – Julius von Sachs (1832–1897)
 S.A.Cain – Stanley Adair Cain (1902–1995) 
 Sacleux – Charles Sacleux (1856–1943)
 Sadeb. – Richard Emil Benjamin Sadebeck (1839–1905)
 Saelán – Anders Thiodolf Saelán (1834–1921) 
 Saff. – William Edwin Safford (1859–1926)
 Sagást. – Abundio Sagástegui Alva (1932–2012)
 Sahlb. – Carl Reinhold Sahlberg (1779–1860)
 Sahni – Birbal Sahni (1891–1949)
 S.A.J.Bell – Stephen Andrew James Bell (born 1967)
 S.Akiyama – Shinobu Akiyama (born 1957)
 Sa.Kurata – Satoru Kurata (1922–1978)
 Salisb. – Richard Anthony Salisbury (1761–1829)
 Salmaki – Yasaman Salmaki (fl. 2016)
 Salm-Dyck – Joseph zu Salm-Reifferscheidt-Dyck (1773–1861)
 Salmon – John Drew Salmon (1802–1859)
 Sam. – Gunnar Samuelsson (1885–1944)
 Sambo – Maria Cengia Sambo (1888–1939)
 S.A.Mori – Scott Alan Mori (1941–2020)
 Samp. – Gonçalo António da Silva Ferreira Sampaio (1865–1937)
 Sander – Henry Frederick Conrad Sander (1847–1920)
 S.Andrews – Susyn M. Andrews (born 1953)
 Sandwith – Noel Yvri Sandwith (1901–1965)
 S.A.Nikitin – Sergei Alekseevich Nikitin (born 1898)
 S.Anil Kumar – S. Anil Kumar (fl. 2008)
 Sanín – Maria José Sanín (fl. 2008)
 Sanio – Carl Gustav Sanio (1832–1891) 
 Sanjappa – Munivenkatappa Sanjappa (born 1951)
 Sankowsky – G. Sankowsky (fl. 2003)
 Santapau – Hermenegild Santapau (1903–1970)
 Santi – Giorgio Santi (1746–1822)
 Santin – Dionete Aparecida Santin (fl. 1991)
 Saporta – Louis Charles Joseph Gaston de Saporta (1823–1895)
 Saralegui – Hildelisa Saralegui Boza (born 1949)
 Sarasin – Karl Friedrich Sarasin (1859–1942)
 Sarato – César Sarato (1830–1893)
 Sarauw – Georg Frederik Ludvig Sarauw (1862–1928)
 Sarg. – Charles Sprague Sargent (1841–1927)
 S.Arn. – Samuel Arnott (1852–1930)
 Sarnth. – Ludwig von Sarnthein (1861–1914)
 Sart. – Giovanni Battista Sartorelli (1780–1853)
 Sartori – Joseph Sartori (1809–1885)
 Sartwell – Henry Parker Sartwell (1792–1867)
 Sasaki – Shun-ichi Sasaki (1888–1960)
 Sasidh. – N. Sasidharan (born 1952) 
 Sathap. – A. Sathapattayanon (fl. 2010)
 Satow – Ernest Mason Satow (1843–1929)
 Sauss. – Horace-Bénédict de Saussure (1740–1799)
 Sauv. – Camille François Sauvageau (1861–1936)
 Sauvages – François Boissier de Sauvages de Lacroix (1706–1767)
 Sauvalle – Francisco Adolfo Sauvalle (1807–1879)
 Sav. – Paul Amedée Ludovic Savatier (1830–1891)
 Savi – Gaetano Savi (1769–1844)
 Savigny – Marie Jules César Lélorgne de Savigny (1777–1851)
 Săvul. – Traian Săvulescu (1889–1963)
 Saw –  (fl. 1997)
 Sax – Karl Sax (1892–1973)
 Say – Thomas Say (1787–1834)
 Sayre – Geneva Sayre (1911–1992)
 S.B.Andrews – S. Brian Andrews (fl. 1977)
 S.B.Heard – Stephen B. Heard (fl. 1988)
 S.B.Jones – Samuel Boscom Jones (1933–2016)
 S.B.Jundz. – Stanisław Bonifacy Jundziłł (1761–1847)
 S.Blackmore – Stephen Blackmore (born 1952)
 S.Boyd – Steve Boyd (fl. 1997)
 S.Br. (also S.Brown) – Stewardson Brown (1867–1921)
 Scannell – Maura J.P. Scannell (1924–2011)
 S.Carter – Susan Carter Holmes (born 1933)
 S.C.Chen – Sing Chi Chen (born 1931)
 S.C.Darwin – Sarah Darwin (born 1964)
 Schaack – Clark G. Schaack (fl. 1987)
 Schacht – Hermann Schacht (1814–1864)
 Schäferh. – Bastian Schäferhoff  (fl. 2009)
 Schäf.-Verw. – Alfons Schäfer-Verwimp (born 1950)
 Schah. – Richard B. Schahinger (born 1955)
 Scharf – Uwe Scharf (born 1965)
 Schauer – Johannes Conrad Schauer (1813–1848)
 S.C.H.Barrett – Spencer C. H. Barrett (born 1948)
 Sch.Bip. – Carl Heinrich 'Bipontinus' Schultz (1805–1867)
 Schchian – Anna Semenovna Schchian (1905–1990)
 Scheb. – M. A. Schebalina (born 1900)
 Scheele – George Heinrich Adolf Scheele (1808–1864)
 Scheer – Friedrich Scheer (1792–1868)
 Scheff. –  (1844–1880)
 Scheffers – W. A. Scheffers (fl. 1981)
 Scheffler – Wolfram Scheffler (born 1938)
 Scheibe – Arnold Scheibe (1901–1989)
 Scheidw. – Michael Joseph François Scheidweiler (1799–1861)
 Scheinvar – Léia Scheinvar (born 1930)
 Scheit – Max Scheit (1858–1888)
 Schelk. – Alexandr Bebutovicz Schelkownikow (1870–1933)
 Schelle – Ernst Schelle (1864–1945)
 Schellenb. – Hans Conrad Schellenberg (1872–1923)
 Schelpe – Edmund André Charles Louis Eloi Schelpe (1924–1985)
 Schelver – Friedrich Joseph Schelver (1778–1832)
 Schemmann – Wilhelm Schemmann (1845 – c. 1920)
 Schemske – Douglas W. Schemske (born 1948)
 Schenck – Johann Heinrich Rudolf Schenck (1860–1927)
 Schenk – Joseph August Schenk (1815–1891)
 Scherb. – Johannes Scherbius (1769–1813)
 Scherer – Johann Andreas Scherer (1755–1844)
 Scherfel – Aurel Wilhelm Scherfel (1835–1895)
 Scherff. – Aladár Scherffel (1865–1938)
 Schery – Robert Walter Schery (1917–1987)
 Schettler – Roland Schettler (fl. 1999)
 Scheuchzer f. – Johannes Scheuchzer (1738–1815)
 Scheuerm. – Richard Scheuermann (1873–1949)
 Scheutz – Nils Johan Wilhelm Scheutz (1836–1889)
 Schew. – Wladimir Schewiakoff (1859–1930)
 Schewe – O. Schewe (born 1892)
 Scheygr. –  (1905–1996)
 Schiede – Christian Julius Wilhelm Schiede (1798–1836)
 Schiffn. – Victor Félix Schiffner (1862–1944)
 Schild. – Herbert Schildhauer (born 1963)
 Schimp. – Wilhelm Philippe Schimper (1808–1880)
 Schindl. – Anton Karl Schindler (1879–1964)
 Schinz – Hans Schinz (1858–1941)
 Schipcz. – Nikolaj Valerianovich Schipczinski (1886–1955)
 Schipp – William August Schipp (1891–1967)
 Schischk. – Boris Konstantinovich Schischkin (1886–1963)
 Schkuhr – Christian Schkuhr (1741–1811)
 Schleich. – Johann Christoph Schleicher (1768–1834) 
 Schleid. – Matthias Jakob Schleiden (1804–1881)
 Schlieph. – Karl Schliephacke (1834–1913)
 Schltdl. – Diederich Franz Leonhard von Schlechtendal (1794–1866)
 Schltr. – Rudolf Schlechter (1872–1925)
 Schmalh. – Johannes Theodor Schmalhausen (1849–1894)
 Schmeil – Franz Otto Schmeil (1860–1943)
 Schmidel – Casimir Christoph Schmidel (1718–1792)
 Schmoll – Hazel Marguerite Schmoll (1891–1990)
 Schnabl – Johann Nepomuk Schnabl (1853–1899)
 Schnack – Benno Julio Christian Schnack (1910–1981)
 Schnarf – Karl Schnarf (1879–1947)
 Schneck – Jacob Schneck (1843–1906)
 Schnee –  (1908–1975)
 Schneev. – George Voorhelm Schneevoogt (1775–1850)
 Schnegg – Hans Schnegg (1875–1950)
 Schneid.-Bind. – E. Schneider-Binder (born 1942)
 Schneid.-Or. – Otto Schneider-Orelli (1880–1965)
 Schnekker – Johannes Daniel Schnekker (born 1794)
 Schnell – Raymond Albert Alfred Schnell (1913–1999)
 Schneller – Johann Jakob Schneller (born 1942)
 Schnepf –  (1931–2016)
 Schnetter – Reinhard Schnetter (born 1936)
 Schnetzl. – Johann Balthasar Schnetzler (1823–1896)
 Schnittsp. – Georg Friedrich Schnittspahn (1810–1865)
 Schnizl. – Adalbert Carl Friedrich Hellwig Conrad Schnizlein (1814–1868)
 Schodde – Richard Schodde (born 1936)
 Schoenef. – Wladimir de Schoenefeld (1816–1875)
 Schoepff – Johann David Schoepff (1752–1800)
 Schönb.-Tem. – Eva Schönbeck-Temesy (1930–2011)
 Schönl. – Johann Lucas Schönlein (1793–1864)
 Schönland – Selmar Schönland (1860–1940)
 Schornh. (also Breen) – Ruth Olive Schornhurst Breen (1905–1987)
 Schot – Anne M. Schot (fl. 1991–2004)
 Schott – Heinrich Wilhelm Schott (1794–1865)
 Schottky –  (1888–1915)
 Schousb. – Peder Kofod Anker Schousboe (1766–1832)
 S.Chow – Shuan Chow (fl. 1962)
 S.Chowdhury – S. Chowdhury (fl. 1944)
 Schrad. – Heinrich Adolph Schrader (1767–1836)
 Schrank – Franz Paula von Schrank (1747–1835)
 Schraut – Winfried Schraut (fl. 2004)
 Schreb. – Johann Christian Daniel von Schreber (1739–1810)
 Schrenk – Alexander Gustav von Schrenk (1816–1876)
 Schrire – Brian David Schrire (born 1953)
 Schröt. – Carl Joseph Schröter (1855–1939)
 Schub. – Gotthilf Heinrich von Schubert (1780–1860)
 Schübl. – Gustav Schübler (1787–1834)
 Schuch. – (Conrad Gideon) Theodor Schuchardt (1829–1892)
 Schuit. – André Schuiteman (born 1960)
 Schult. – Josef August Schultes (1773–1831)
 Schult.f. – Julius Hermann Schultes (1804–1840)
 Schultz – Carl Friedrich Schultz (1765 or 1766–1837)
 Schultz Sch. – Carl Heinrich 'Schultzenstein' Schultz (1798–1871)
 Schum. – Julius (Heinrich Karl) Schumann (1810–1868)
 Schumach. – Heinrich Christian Friedrich Schumacher (1757–1830)
 Schur – Philipp Johann Ferdinand Schur (1799–1878)
 Schuyler – Alfred Ernest Schuyler (born 1935)
 Schwägr. – Christian Friedrich Schwägrichen (1775–1853)
 Schwantes – Martin Heinrich Gustav Schwantes (1881–1960)
 Schwartz – Ernest Justus Schwartz (1869–1939)
 Schweick. – Herold Georg Wilhelm Johannes Schweickerdt (1903–1977)
 Schweigg. – August Friedrich Schweigger (1783–1821)
 Schwein. – Lewis David von Schweinitz (1780–1834)
 Schweinf. – Georg August Schweinfurth (1836–1925)
 Schwer. – Fritz Kurt Alexander von Schwerin (1847–1925)
 S.Clay –  (1901–1980)
 S.C.Keeley – Sterling C. Keeley (born 1948)
 S.C.Lee – Shun Ching Lee (1892–1969)
 Scop. – Giovanni Antonio Scopoli (1723–1788)
 Scort. – Benedetto Scortechini (1845–1886)
 Scott-Elliot – George Francis Scott-Elliot (1862–1934)
 Scribn. – Frank Lamson Scribner (1851–1938)
 S.C.Srivast. – Suresh Chandra Srivastava (born 1944)
 S.C.Sun – Siang Chung Sun (born 1908)
 S.Curtis – Samuel Curtis (1779–1860)
 S.D.Jones – Stanley D. Jones (fl. 1992)
 S.D.Lawson – Sheryl D. Lawson (fl. 2006)
 S.Dransf. – Soejatmi Dransfield (born 1939)
 S.Dressler – Stefan Dressler (born 1964)
 S.D.Sundb. – Scott D. Sundberg (1954–2004)
 Seagrief – Stanley Charles Seagrief (1927–1995) 
 Sealy – Joseph Robert Sealy (1907–2000)
 Seaton – Henry Eliason Seaton (1869–1893)
 Seaver – Fred Jay Seaver (1877–1970)
 Sebert – Hippolyte Sebert (1839–1930)
 Sebsebe – Sebsebe Demissew (born 1953)
 Seçmen – Özcan Seçmen (born 1947) 
 Secondat – Jean Baptiste de Secondat (1716–1796)
 Secr. – Louis Secretan (1758–1839)
 Sedgw. – Leonard John Sedgwick (1883–1925)
 Seelanan – T. Seelanan (fl. 2010)
 Seem. – Berthold Carl Seemann (1825–1871)
 Seemen – Karl Otto von Seemen (1838–1910)
 Seenus – Josef von Seenus (1825–1871)
 Seetzen – Ulrich Jasper Seetzen (1767–1811)
 S.E.Freire –  (born 1954)
 S.E.Fröhner – Sigurd Erich Fröhner (born 1941)
 Ség. – Jean François Séguier (1703–1784)
 Seibert – Russell Jacob Seibert (1914–2004)
 Seidenf. – Gunnar Seidenfaden (1908–2001)
 Seigler – David Stanley Seigler (born 1940)
 Seisums – A. G. Seisums (born 1962)
 Selander – Nils Sten Edvard Selander (1891–1957)
 Sellow – Friedrich Sellow (Sello) (1789–1831)
 Selvak. – R. Selvakumari (fl. 2009)
 Semaan – Myrna T. Semaan (born 1968) 
 Semple – John C. Semple (born 1947)
 Sendtn. – Otto Sendtner (1813–1859)
 Seneb. – Jean Senebier (1742–1809)
 Senghas – Karlheinz Senghas (1928–2004)
 Senn – Gustav Alfred Senn (1875–1945)
 Sennen – Frère Sennen (1861–1937)
 Sennholz – Gustav Sennholz (1850–1895)
 Sennikov – Alexander Nikolaevitsch Sennikov (born 1972)
 Senterre – Bruno Senterre (born 1976)
 Ser. – Nicolas Charles Seringe (1776–1858)
 Serg. – Lydia Palladievna Sergievskaya (1897–1970)
 Serra – Luis Serra (born 1966)
 Servett. – Camille Servettaz (1870–1947)
 Sessé – Martín Sessé y Lacasta (1751–1808)
 Setch. – William Albert Setchell (1864–1943)
 Seub. – Moritz August Seubert (1818–1878)
 Seward – Albert Charles Seward (1863–1941)
 S.F.Blake – Sidney Fay Blake (1892–1959)
 S.F.Gray – Samuel Frederick Gray (1766–1828)
 S.F.Price – Sarah Frances Price (1849–1903)
 S.Fuentes – Susy Fuentes-Bazan (fl. 2011)
 S.G.Gmel. – Samuel Gottlieb Gmelin (c. 1744–1774)
 S.G.Hao – Shu-Gang Hao (born 1942)
 S.Gibson – Samuel Gibson (1790–1849) 
 S.G.M.Carr – Stella Grace Maisie Carr (1912–1988)
 S.G.Pradhan – Sudhir Gajanan Pradhan (born 1950)
 S.G.Zhang – Shi Gang Zhang (fl. 2005)
 Shadbolt – George Shadbolt (1817–1901)
 Shafer – John Adolph Shafer (1863–1918)
 Shakhm. – I. Sh. Shakhmedov (fl. 1977–1991)
 Shaler – Nathaniel Southgate Shaler (1841–1906)
 Sharp – Aaron John Sharp (1904–1997)
 Sharsm. – Carl William Sharsmith (1903–1994)
 S.Hatt. –  (1915–1992)
 Shaver – Jesse Milton Shaver (1888–1961)
 Shear – Cornelius Lott Shear (1865–1956)
 S.Hellqv. – Sven Hellqvist (fl. 1993) 
 Sheppard – Harriet Campbell Sheppard (fl. 1783–1867)
 Sherff – Earl Edward Sherff (1886–1966)
 Sherman – Harry L. Sherman (born 1927)
 Shevock – James Robert Shevock (born 1950)
 Shibata – Keita Shibata (1877–1949)
 Shiller – Ivan Shiller (born 1895)
 Shim – Phyau Soon Shim (born 1942)
 Shimek – Bohumil Shimek (1861–1937)
 Shinners – Lloyd Herbert Shinners (1918–1971)
 Shipunov – Alexey B. Shipunov (born 1965)
 Shiras. – Yasuyoshi (Miho or Homi) Shirasawa (1868–1947)
 S.H.Kang – Shin Ho Kang (born 1968)
 Sh.Kurata – Shigeo Kurata (fl. 1965–2008)
 S.H.Lin – Shan Hsiung Lin (born 1942)
 Shockley – William Hillman Shockley (1855–1925)
 Short – Charles Wilkins Short (1794–1863)
 Shreve – Forrest Shreve (1878–1950)
 Shrock – Robert Rakes Shrock (born 1904)
 Shull – George Harrison Shull (1874–1954)
 Shultz – Benjamin Shultz (1772–1814)
 Shute – Cedric H. Shute (fl. 1989)
 Shuttlew. – Robert James Shuttleworth (1810–1874)
 Shu H.Wu – Shu Hui Wu (fl. 2012)
 S.H.Wright – Samuel Hart Wright (1825–1905)
 Sibi – M. Sibi (fl. 2008)
 Sibth. – John Sibthorp (1758–1796)
 Sickenb. – Ernst Sickenberger (1831–1895)
 Sieber – Franz Sieber (1789–1844)
 Siebert – August Siebert (1854–1923)
 Siebold – Philipp Franz von Siebold (1796–1866)
 Siegerist – Emily Steffan Siegerist (born 1925)
 Siegler – David Stanley Seigler (born 1940)
 Siehe – Walter Siehe (1859–1928)
 Sierra – Eugeni Sierra (1919–1999)
 Siev. – Johann August Carl Sievers (1762–1795)
 Silba – John Silba (1961–2015)
 Sillans – Roger Sillans (fl. 1952)
 Silliman – Benjamin Silliman (1779–1864)
 Silva Manso – António Luiz Patricio da Silva Manso (1788–1848)
 Silverst. – Philip Arthur Silverstone-Sopkin (born 1939)
 Sim – Thomas Robertson Sim (1856–1938)
 Sim.-Bianch. – Rosangela Simão-Bianchini (fl. 1997)
 Simmonds – Joseph Henry Simmonds (1845–1936)
 Simon – Eugène Simon (1848–1924)
 Simonet – Marc Simonet (1899–1965)
 Simon-Louis – Leon L. Simon-Louis (1834–1913)
 Simpson – Charles Torrey Simpson (1826–1932)
 Sims – John Sims (1749–1831)
 Sinclair – Sir John Sinclair, 1st Baronet (1754–1835)
 Singer – Rolf Singer (1906–1994)
 Sinnott – Edmund Ware Sinnott (1888–1968)
 Sint. – Paul Ernst Emil Sintenis (1847–1907)
 S.J.Chen – Sen Jen Chen (born 1933)
 S.J.Cheng – Shi Jun Cheng (fl. 1980)
 S.J.Dillon – Steven J. Dillon (fl. 2011)
 S.Jenn. – Samuel Jennings (fl. 1875)
 S.J.Hao – Si Jun Hao (born 1965)
 S.Julia –  (fl. 1998)
 S.J.van Leeuwen – Stephen J. van Leeuwen (born 1962)
 S.J.Zeng – Song Jun Zeng (fl. 2010)
 S.J.Zhu – Shi Jie Zhu (fl. 2008)
 Skan –  (1870–1939)
 S.K.Chen – Shu Kun Chen (born 1936)
 Skean – James Dan Skean (born 1958)
 Skeels – Homer Collar Skeels (1873–1934)
 S.Kelso – Sylvia "Tass" Kelso (1953–2016)
 S.Kim – Sangtae Kim (born 1967)
 S.K.Lee – Shu Kang Lee (born 1915)
 S.Knapp – Sandra Diane Knapp (born 1956)
 S.Koehler – Samantha Koehler (born 1975)
 Škorničk. – Jana Škorničkova (born 1975)
 Skottsb. – Carl Johan Fredrik Skottsberg (1880–1963)
 Skov – Flemming Skov (born 1958)
 S.Kuros. – Sachiko Kurosawa (1927–2011)
 Skutch – Alexander Skutch (1904–2004)
 Skvarla – John Jerome Skvarla (1935–2014)
 S.K.Wu – Su Kung Wu (1935–2013)
 S.K.Yu – Sheng Kun Yu (fl. 2013)
 Slavin – Bernard Henry Slavin (1873–1960)
 S.L.Clark – Stephen L. Clark (born 1940)
 S.Lee – Sangtae Lee (born 1944)
 Sleumer – Hermann Otto Sleumer (1906–1993)
 Sloane – Hans Sloane (1660–1753)
 Slogt. — Egbertus van Slogteren (1888–1968)
 Slooten – Dirk Fok van Slooten (1891–1953)
 S.L.Welsh – Stanley Larson Welsh (born 1928)
 S.L.Zhang – Shi Liang Zhang (born 1931)
 Sm. – James Edward Smith (1759–1828)
 Small – John Kunkel Small (1869–1938)
 Smalley – Eugene Byron Smalley (1926–2002)
 S.M.Baker – Sarah Martha Baker (1887–1917)
 S.McPherson – Stewart R. McPherson (born 1983)
 S.M.Douglas – S.M. Douglas (fl. 2009)
 Smirnova – Zoya Nikolayevna Smirnova (1898–1979)
 Smissen– Rob D. Smissen (fl. 2013)
 S.Misra – Sarat Misra (born 1943)
 S.Moore – Spencer Le Marchant Moore (1850–1931)
 S.M.Reddy – Solipuram Madhusudhan Reddy (born 1940)
 S.M.R.Leopold – Leopold III, S. M. Roi (1901–1983)
 S.Murug. – S. Murugesan (fl. 2009)
 Smuts – Jan Christiaan Smuts (1870–1950)
 Smyth – Bernard Bryan Smyth (1843–1913)
 S.N.Biswas – Samarendra Nath Biswas (1939–2005)
 Sneath – Peter Henry Andrews Sneath (1923–2011)
 Snelling – Lilian Snelling (1879–1972)
 S.N.Hegde – S.N. Hegde (fl. 1981)
 Snijman – Dierdré A. Snijman (born 1948)
 Snyder – Leon Carleton Snyder (1908–1987)
 Sobol. – Gregor Fedorovitch Sobolewsky (1741–1807)
 Sobral – Marcos Sobral (born 1960) 
 Soderstr. – Thomas Robert Soderstrom (1936–1987)
 Sodiro – Luis Sodiro (1836–1909)
 Soegeng – Wertit Soegeng-Reksodihardjo (born 1935)
 Soepadmo – Engkik Soepadmo (born 1937)
 S.O.Grose – Susan Oviatt Grose (born 1974)
 Sohmer – Seymour Hans Sohmer (born 1941)  
 Soják – Jiří Soják (1936–2012)
 S.Okamura – Shûtai Okamura (1877–1947)
 Sol. – Daniel Solander (1733–1782)
 Solbrig – Otto Thomas Solbrig (born 1930)
 Sole – William Sole (1741–1802)
 Soleirol – Joseph François Soleirol (1781–1863)
 Soler. – Hans Solereder (1860–1920)
 Solms – Hermann Maximilian Carl Ludwig Friedrich zu Solms-Laubach (1842–1915)
 Solomon – James C. Solomon (born 1952)
 Soltis – Douglas E. Soltis (born 1958)
 Sommerf. – Søren Christian Sommerfelt (1794–1838)
 Sond. – Otto Wilhelm Sonder (1812–1881)
 Songeon – André Songeon (1826–1905)
 Sonn. – Pierre Sonnerat (1748–1814)
 Sonnini – Charles-Nicolas-Sigisbert Sonnini de Manoncourt (1751–1812)
 Soó – Károly Rezső Soó von Bere (1903–1980)
 Sopp (also Johan-Olsen) – Olav Johan Sopp (1860–1931)
 S.Ortiz – Santiago Ortiz Núñez (born 1957)
 Sosn. – Dmitrii Ivanovich Sosnowsky (1886–1952)
 Sothers – Cynthia Sothers (born 1963)
 Soulié – Joseph Auguste Soulié (1868–1930)
 Southw. – Effie A. Southworth (1860–1947)
 Sowerby – James Sowerby (1757–1822)
 Soyaux – Hermann Soyaux (born 1852)
 Spach – Édouard Spach (1801–1879)
 Spalding – Volney Morgan Spalding (1849–1918) 
 Span. – Johan Baptist Spanoghe (1798–1838)
 Sparrm. – Anders Sparrman (1748–1820)
 Späth – Franz Ludwig Späth (1838–1913)
 S.P.Chen – Shi Pin Chen (fl. 2014)
 S.P.Churchill – Steven Paul Churchill (born 1948)
 S.P.Darwin – Steven P. Darwin (born 1949)
 Specht – Raymond Specht (1924–2021)
 Speg. – Carlo Luigi (Carlos Luis) Spegazzini (1858–1926)
 Spellenb. – Richard Spellenberg (born 1940)
 Spenn. – Fridolin Karl Leopold Spenner (1798–1841)
 Speta – Franz Speta (1941–2015)
 Spicer – William Webb Spicer (1820–1879)
 S.Pierce – Simon Pierce (born 1974)
 Spillman – William Jasper Spillman (1863–1931)
 Spix – Johann Baptist Ritter von Spix (1781–1826)
 Sprague – Thomas Archibald Sprague (1877–1958)
 Spreng. – Curt Polycarp Joachim Sprengel (1766–1833)
 Spring – Antoine Frédéric Spring (1814–1872)
 Spruce – Richard Spruce (1817–1893)
 S.Q.Cai – Shao Qing Cai (fl. 2003)
 S.Q.Tong – Shao Quan Tong (born 1935)
 Squivet – Joseph Squivet de Carondelet (1878–1966)
 Sreek. – Puthenpurayil Viswanathan Sreekumar (born 1954)
 Sreem. – C. P. Sreemadhavan (fl. 1965–1977)
 S.R.Jones – Sandra Raelene Jones (born 1969)
 S.R.Ramesh – S. R. Ramesh (fl. 1986)
 S.R.Yadav – Shrirang Ramchandra Yadav (born 1954)
 S.S.Chang – Siu Shih Chang (born 1918)
 S.Schauer – Sebastian Schauer (fl. 1847)
 S.S.Chien – Sung Shu Chien (1883–1965)
 S.S.Hooper – Sheila Spenser Hooper (born 1925)
 S.S.Jain – S.S. Jain (born 1952)
 S.S.Larsen – Supee Saksuwan Larsen (born 1939)
 S.S.Renner – Susanne Sabine Renner (born 1954)
 S.Suárez – Stella Suárez (fl. 2000)
 S.Suzuki – Shizuo Suzuki (fl. 1962)
 S.S.Ying – Shao Shun Ying (fl. 1970)
 Stace – Clive Anthony Stace (born 1938)
 Stackh. – John Stackhouse (1742–1819)
 Stafleu – Frans Antonie Stafleu (1921–1997)
 Stajsic – V. Stajsic (fl. 2000)
 St.-Amans – Jean Florimond Boudon de Saint-Amans (1748–1831)
 Standl. – Paul Carpenter Standley (1884–1963)
 Stanger – William Stanger (surveyor) (1811–1854)
 Stanley – Trevor Donald Stanley (born 1952)
 Stannard – Brian Leslie Stannard (1944–2022)
 Stansb. – Howard Stansbury (1806–1863)
 Stapf – Otto Stapf (1857–1933)
 Staples –  (born 1953)
 Staszk. – Jerzy Staszkiewicz (born 1929)
 Staudt – Günter Staudt (1926–2008)
 S.T.Blake – Stanley Thatcher Blake (1910–1973)
 St.Cloud – Stanley F. Goessling-St Cloud (fl. 1950s)
 Stearn – William Thomas Stearn (1911–2001)
 Stebbing – Edward Percy Stebbing (1872–1960)
 Stebbins – George Ledyard Stebbins (1906–2000)
 Stebler – Friedrich Gottlieb Stebler (1852–1935)
 Stedman – John Gabriel Stedman (1744–1797)
 Steedman – Ellen Constance Steedman (1859–1949)
 Steenis – Cornelis Gijsbert Gerrit Jan van Steenis (1901–1986)
 Steentoft – Margaret Steentoft (born 1927)
 Steere – William Campbell Steere (1907–1989)
 Steetz – Joachim Steetz (1804–1862)
 Stein – Berthold Stein (1847–1899)
 Steinh. – Adolph Steinheil (1810–1839)
 Stelfox – Arthur Wilson Stelfox (1883–1972)
 Steller – Georg Wilhelm Steller (1709–1746)
 Stent – Sydney Margaret Stent (1875–1942)
 Steph. – Franz Stephani (1842–1927)
 Stephan – Christian Friedrich Stephan (1757–1814)
 Štěpánek – Jan Štěpánek (born 1955)
 Sterba – Günther Sterba (born 1922)
 Stern – Frederick Claude Stern (1884–1967)
 Sternb. – Kaspar Maria von Sternberg (1761–1838)
 Sterns – Emerson Ellick Sterns (1846–1926)
 Steud. – Ernst Gottlieb von Steudel (1783–1856)
 Stev. (alt. Steven) – see Christian von Steven
 Stevels – J.M.C. Stevels (fl. 1988)
 Steven (alt. Stev.) – Christian von Steven (1781–1863)
 Steward – Albert Newton Steward (1897–1959)
 Steyerm. – Julian Alfred Steyermark (1909–1988)
 St George – Ian M. St George (fl. 1994)
 Stiehler – August Wilhelm Stiehler (1797–1878)
 Stierst. – Christian Stierstorfer (born 1969)
 Stiles – Charles Wardell Stiles (1867–1933 or 1941)
 Still. – Benjamin Stillingfleet (1702–1771)
 Stimpson – Margaret L. Stimpson (born 1954)
 Stimson – William R. Stimson (fl. 1970)
 Stirt. – James Stirton (1833–1917)
 S.T.Kim – Sang-Tae Kim (born 1971)
 St.-Lag. – Jean Baptiste Saint-Lager (1825–1912)
 Stockdale – Phyllis Margaret Stockdale (1927–1989)
 Stocker – Otto Stocker (1888–1979)
 Stockey – Ruth A. Stockey (fl. 1998)
 Stocking – Kenneth Morgan Stocking (born 1911)
 Stockm. – Siegfried Stockmayer (1868–1933)
 Stockmans – François Stockmans (1904–1986)
 Stocks – John Ellerton Stocks (1822–1854)
 Stockw. – William Palmer Stockwell (1898–1950)
 Stoj. – Nikolai Andreev Stojanov (1883–1968)
 Stokes – Jonathan S. Stokes (1755–1831)
 Stoliczka – Ferdinand Stoliczka (1838–1874)
 Stoneman – Bertha M. Stoneman (1866–1943)
 Stopes – Marie Charlotte Carmichael Stopes (1880–1958)
 Story – Robert Story (1913–1999)
 Strähler – Adolf Strähler (1829–1897) 
 Strasb. – Eduard Strasburger (1844–1912)
 Strausb. – Perry Daniel Strausbaugh (1886–1965)
 S.T.Reynolds – Sally T. Reynolds (born 1932)
 Strid – Arne Strid (born 1943)
 S.Tripathi – Sunil Tripathi (fl. 1999)
 Stritch – L.R.Stritch (fl. 1982)
 Strobl – Gabriel Strobl (1846–1925)
 Strutt – Jacob George Strutt (1790–1864)
 Struwe – Lena Struwe (born 1967)
 Stschegl. – Serge S. Stscheglejew (1820–1859)
 Stuart – John Stuart, 3rd Earl of Bute (or as John Stuart Bute) (1713–1792)
 Stuchlík – Jaroslav Stuchlík (1890–1967)
 Stud.-Steinh. – Bernhard Studer-Steinhäuslin (1847–1910)
 Stuessy – Tod Falor Stuessy (born 1943)
 Stuntz – Stephen Conrad Stuntz (1875–1918)
 Stur – Dionys Rudolf Josef Stur (1827–1893)
 Sturm – Jacob W. Sturm (1771–1848)
 St.-Yves – Alfred (Marie Augustine) Saint-Yves (1855–1933)
 Suckow – Georg Adolf (Adolph) Suckow (1751–1813)
 Sucre – Dimitri Sucre Benjamin (fl. 1962)
 Suddee – Somran Suddee (fl. 2004)
 Sudre – Henri L. Sudre (1862–1918)
 Sudw. – George Bishop Sudworth (1864–1927)
 Suess. – Karl Suessenguth (1893–1955)
 Suetsugu – Kenji Suetsugu (fl. 2012)
 Suffrian – Christian Wilhelm Ludwig Eduard Suffrian (1805–1876)
 Sugim. – Junichi Sugimoto (born 1901)
 Sukaczev – Vladimir Nikolayevich Sukachev (Nikolajevich Sukaczev) (1880–1967)
 Sukhor. – Alexander Petrovich Sukhorukov (born 1967)
 Suksathan – Piyakaset Suksathan (born 1960)
 Suksd. – Wilhelm Nikolaus Suksdorf (1850–1932)
 Suleiman – Monica Suleiman (fl. 2013)
 Sull. – William Starling Sullivant (1803–1873)
 Sümbül – Hüseyin Sümbül (born 1955)
 Summerb. – Richard Summerbell (born 1956)
 Summerh. – Victor Samuel Summerhayes (1897–1974)
 Sumnev. – Georgji Prokopievič Sumnevicz (1909–1947)
 Sünd. – Franz Sündermann (1864–1946)
 Sunding –  (born 1937)
 Surian – Joseph Donat Surian (died 1691)
 Suringar – Willem Frederik Reinier Suringar (1832–1898)
 Susanna – Alfonso Susanna (born 1955) (also Alfonso Susanna de la Serna)
 Suslova – T. A. Suslova (born 1944)
 Sutar – Shrikant Sutar (fl. 2013)
 Suter – Johann Rudolf Suter (1766–1827)
 Sutherl. – James Sutherland (c. 1639–1719)
 Sutt. – Charles Sutton (1756–1846)
 Sved. – Nils (Eberhard) Svedelius (1873–1960)
 Svenson – Henry Knute Svenson (1897–1986)
 Svent. – Eric R. Svensson Sventenius (1910–1973)
 S.Vidal – Sebastian Vidal (1842–1889)
 Sw. – Olof Peter Swartz (1760–1818)
 Swainson – William John Swainson (1789–1855)
 Swallen – Jason Richard Swallen (1903–1991)
 S.Waller – S. Waller (fl. 1951)
 Swanepoel – Wessel Swanepoel (born 1957)
 S.W.Arnell – Sigfrid Wilhelm Arnell (1895–1970)
 S.Watson – Sereno Watson (1826–1892)
 Sweet – Robert Sweet (1783–1835)
 Swenson – Ulf Swenson (born 1959)
 Swezey – Goodwin Deloss Swezey (1851–1934)
 Swingle – Walter Tennyson Swingle (1871–1952)
 S.W.Jeffrey – Shirley Winifred Jeffrey (1930–2014)
 S.W.L.Jacobs – Surrey Wilfrid Laurance Jacobs (1946–2009)
 S.X.Zhu – Shi Xin Zhu (fl. 2008)
 S.Y.Bao – Shi Ying Bao (born 1935)
 Syd. – Hans Sydow (1879–1946) (son of Paul Sydow)
 S.Y.Hu – Shiu-Ying Hu (1910–2012)
 S.W.Chung – Shih Wen Chung (fl. 1998)
 S.W.Liu – Shang Wu Liu (born 1934)
 Syme – John Thomas Irvine Boswell Syme (1822–1888)
 Symington – Colin Fraser Symington (1905–1943)
 Symon – David Eric Symon (1920–2011)
 Symons – Jelinger Symons (1778–1851)
 S.Y.Sm. – Selena Y. Smith (fl. 2004)
 S.Y.Wang – Sui-Yi Wang (born 1934)
 S.Y.Wong – Sin Yeng Wong (born 1975)
 Szabó – Zoltán von Szabó (1882–1944) 
 S.Zhu – Shu Zhu (fl. 2003)
 S.Z.Huang – Se Zei Huang (fl. 1980s)
 Szyszył. – Ignaz von Szyszyłowicz (1857–1910)

T–Z 

To find entries for T–Z, use the table of contents above.

 
1